Three-time defending champion Roger Federer defeated Rafael Nadal in the final, 6–0, 7–6(7–5), 6–7(2–7), 6–3 to win the gentlemen's singles tennis title at the 2006 Wimbledon Championships. It was his fourth Wimbledon title and his eighth major title overall. It would be the first of three consecutive years that Federer and Nadal would contest the Wimbledon final.

1992 champion and former world No. 1 Andre Agassi made his last Wimbledon appearance, losing to Nadal in the third round.

Seeds

  Roger Federer (champion)
  Rafael Nadal (final)
  Andy Roddick (third round)
  David Nalbandian (third round)
  Ivan Ljubičić (third round)
  Lleyton Hewitt (quarterfinals)
  Mario Ančić (quarterfinals)
  James Blake (third round)
  Nikolay Davydenko (first round)
  Fernando González (third round)
  Tommy Robredo (second round)
  Thomas Johansson (first round)
  Tomáš Berdych (fourth round)
  Radek Štěpánek (quarterfinals)
  Sébastien Grosjean (third round)
  Gastón Gaudio (second round)
  Robby Ginepri (first round)
  Marcos Baghdatis (semifinals)
  Tommy Haas (third round)
  Dominik Hrbatý (first round)
  Gaël Monfils (first round)
  Jarkko Nieminen (quarterfinals)
  David Ferrer (fourth round)
  Juan Carlos Ferrero (third round)
  Andre Agassi (third round)
  Olivier Rochus (third round)
  Dmitry Tursunov (fourth round)
  Fernando Verdasco (fourth round)
  Paradorn Srichaphan (first round)
  Kristof Vliegen (second round)
  Nicolás Massú (first round)
  Paul-Henri Mathieu (first round)

Qualifying

Draw

Finals

Top half

Section 1

Section 2

Section 3

Section 4

Bottom half

Section 5

Section 6

Section 7

Section 8

References

External links

 2006 Wimbledon Championships – Men's draws and results at the International Tennis Federation

Men's Singles
Wimbledon Championship by year – Men's singles